Wheatland Township is one of twenty townships in Fayette County, Illinois, USA.  As of the 2010 census, its population was 467 and it contained 246 housing units.

Geography

Unincorporated towns
 Saint James

Cemeteries
The township contains these five cemeteries: German Reformed, Lovett, Old Loogootee, Sidener and Stein.

Major highways
  Interstate 70
  Illinois Route 185

Demographics

School districts
 Brownstown Community Unit School District 201
 Saint Elmo Community Unit School District 202

Political districts
 Illinois' 19th congressional district
 State House District 102
 State Senate District 51

References
 
 United States Census Bureau 2007 TIGER/Line Shapefiles
 United States National Atlas

External links
 City-Data.com
 Illinois State Archives

Townships in Fayette County, Illinois
Populated places established in 1859
Townships in Illinois
1859 establishments in Illinois